Temnotropidae is an extinct family of fossil sea snails, marine gastropod mollusks in the superfamily Haliotoidea, the abalones and their allies (according to the taxonomy of the Gastropoda by Bouchet & Rocroi, 2005). This family has no subfamilies.

Genera
Genera within the family Temnotropidae include:
 Temnotropis, the type genus

References 

 Cox, L. R. (1960). Thoughts on the classification of the Gastropoda. Proceedings of the Malacological Society of London. 33(6): 239−261
 Paleobiology database info